Group D of the EuroBasket 2015 took place between 5 and 10 September 2015. The group played all of its games at Arena Riga in Riga, Latvia.

The group is composed of Belgium, Czech Republic, Estonia, Latvia, Lithuania and Ukraine. The four best ranked teams advanced to the second round.

Standings

All times are local (UTC+3).

5 September

Czech Republic v Estonia

Belgium v Latvia

Lithuania v Ukraine

6 September

Estonia v Belgium

Latvia v Lithuania

Ukraine v Czech Republic

7 September

Lithuania v Belgium

Czech Republic v Latvia

Ukraine v Estonia

9 September

Belgium v Czech Republic

Latvia v Ukraine

Estonia v Lithuania

10 September

Ukraine v Belgium

Latvia v Estonia

Czech Republic v Lithuania

External links
Official website

Group D
International basketball competitions hosted by Latvia
2015–16 in Latvian basketball
Sports competitions in Riga
21st century in Riga
2015–16 in Ukrainian basketball
2015–16 in Czech basketball
2015–16 in Estonian basketball
2015–16 in Belgian basketball